Pasak-e Sofla (also Romanized as Pasak-e Soflá; also known as Pasak and Pasak-e Pā'īn) is a village in Firuraq Rural District, in the Central District of Khoy County, West Azerbaijan Province, Iran. At the 2006 census, its population was 1,944, in 428 families.

References 

Populated places in Khoy County